Ri Chol (born 29 January 1976) is a North Korean boxer. He competed in the men's lightweight event at the 1996 Summer Olympics.

References

1976 births
Living people
North Korean male boxers
Olympic boxers of North Korea
Boxers at the 1996 Summer Olympics
Place of birth missing (living people)
Boxers at the 1998 Asian Games
Asian Games competitors for North Korea
Lightweight boxers